Gumuz (also spelled Gumaz) is a dialect cluster spoken along the border of Ethiopia and Sudan. It has been tentatively classified within the Nilo-Saharan family. Most Ethiopian speakers live in Kamashi Zone and Metekel Zone of the Benishangul-Gumuz Region, although a group of 1,000 reportedly live outside the town of Welkite (Unseth 1989). The Sudanese speakers live in the area east of Er Roseires, around Famaka and Fazoglo on the Blue Nile, extending north along the border. Dimmendaal et al. (2019) suspect that the poorly attested varieties spoken along the river constitute a distinct language, Kadallu.

An early record of this language is a wordlist from the Mount Guba area compiled in February 1883 by Juan Maria Schuver.

Varieties
Varieties are not all mutually intelligible. By that standard, there are two or three Gumuz languages. Grammatical forms are distinct between northern and southern Gumuz.

Daats'iin, discovered in 2013, is clearly a distinct language, though closest to southern Gumuz. The poorly attested varieties in Sudan are likely a distinct language as well, Kadallu. (See Bʼaga languages.)

Ethnologue lists  Guba, Wenbera, Sirba, Agalo, Yaso, Mandura, Dibate, and Metemma as Gumuz dialects, with Mandura, Dibate, and Metemma forming a dialect cluster.

Ahland (2004) provides comparative lexical data for the Guba, Mandura, North Dibat'e, Wenbera, Sirba Abay, Agelo Meti, Yaso, and Metemma dialects.

Phonology
Gumuz has both ejective consonants and implosives. The implosive quality is being lost at the velar point of articulation in some dialects (Unseth 1989).  There is a series of palatal consonants, including both ejective and implosive.  In some dialects, e.g. Sirba, there is a labialized palatalized bilabial stop, as in the word for 'rat'  (Unseth 1989).

Consonants 

 The tap [ɾ] mainly occurs in morpheme-internal positions, and not in word-initial position. It also occurs as an allophone of /ɗ/ in intervocalic and word-final positions.

 A trill [r] may occur from ideophones or as a result of loanwords from Amharic.

 A velar implosive [ɠ] tends to only exist in the Agelo Meti dialect.
 A labialized bilabial plosive [bʷ] tends to only exist in the Sirba Abay dialect.
 A voiced fricative [β] may occur when /ɓ/ tends to weaken in word-final position in some dialects.

Both dialects 

 The labio dental [v] only occurs in rare distribution, and mainly occurs in intervocalic and word-initial positions. It is also possibly introduced via derivation from ideophones.
 The palatal [ɲ] only occurs word-internally in intervocalic environments, before a palatal consonant, or as an allophone of /n/ before a front vowel.
 [ŋʷ] only occurs in rare distribution, or when /ŋ/ occurs before a weakened short rounded vowel.
 Other labialized consonants [kʷ, ɡʷ, kʼʷ, χʷ] tend to occur as a result of velar or uvular consonants preceding weakened short rounded vowels that precede another vowel.

Vowels 

 Short allophones of /i, e, a, o, u/ can be heard as [ɪ, ɛ, ə, ɔ, ʊ].
 A central close vowel [ɨ] may occur in various positions after a shortened /u/ when labializing a velar or uvular consonant.

Tone 
Tones are high and low, with downstep.

Grammar
Word order is AVO, with marked nominative case, though there is AOV order in the north, probably from Amharic influence .

In intransitive clauses, subjects in S–V order are unmarked, whereas those in V–S order are marked for nominative case.

Notes

References
 Ahland, Colleen Anne. A Grammar of Northern and Southern Gumuz. Doctoral dissertation, University of Oregon.
 Dimmendaal, Gerrit J., 2000. "Number marking and noun categorization in Nilo- Saharan languages". Anthrolopological Linguistics 42:214-261.

Further reading 
 Ahland, Colleen Anne. 2004. "Linguistic variation within Gumuz: a study of the relationship between historical change and intelligibility." M.A. thesis. University of Texas at Arlington.
 Colleen Ahland. 2011. Noun incorporation and predicate classifiers in Gumuz
 Bender, M. Lionel. 1979. Gumuz: a sketch of grammar and lexicon. Afrika und Übersee 62: 38-69.
 Unseth, Peter. 1985. "Gumuz: a dialect survey report." Journal of Ethiopian Studies 18: 91-114.
 Unseth, Peter. 1989. "Selected aspects of Gumuz phonology." In Taddese Beyene (ed.), Proceedings of the eighth International Conference on Ethiopian Studies, vol. 2, 617-32. Addis Ababa: Institute of Ethiopian Studies.
Uzar, Henning. 1993. Studies in Gumuz: Sese phonology and TMA system. In Topics in Nilo-Saharan linguistics, edited by M.L. Bender. Hamburg: Helmut Buske: 347-383.
 World Atlas of Language Structures information on Gumuz
 Website maintained by the Gumuz language community with published literature in the language

External links 
 Gumuz basic lexicon at the Global Lexicostatistical Database

Languages of Ethiopia
Languages of Sudan
Subject–verb–object languages
Bʼaga languages